Chihhang Air Base, also known as Taitung Air Force Base, is a military airport operated by the Republic of China Air Force in Taitung County, Taiwan. It is best known for its extensive underground hangars.

History
In 2018 the Air Force issued a solicitation for an automated CIWS system to add an additional layer of protection to Chihhang Air Base.

It has been named as the likely home for two squadrons of F-16Vs Taiwan will acquire from the US starting in 2023. The location was recommended by the Institute for National Defense and Security Research.

Facilities
The Shihzishan (石子山) or “Stone Mountain” complex is an underground hangar and support complex located at the north end of the air base. Its tunnels can shelter up to eighty aircraft.

See also
Taoyuan Air Base
Ching Chuan Kang Air Base
Chiashan Air Force Base

References

Republic of China Air Force
Airports in Taitung County
Military installations of the Republic of China